The West Pomeranian Voivodeship Sejmik is the regional legislature of the Voivodeship of West Pomerania in Poland. It is a unicameral parliamentary body consisting of thirty councillors chosen during regional elections for a five-year term. The current chairperson of the assembly is Maria Ilnicka-Mądry from BS.

The assembly elects the executive board that acts as the collective executive for the provincial government, headed by the voivodeship marshal. The current Executive Board of Pomerania is a coalition government between Civic Coalition, Polish People's Party and the Democratic Left Alliance under the leadership of Marshal Olgierd Geblewicz of Civic Coalition.

The assembly convenes within the Sejmik Building in Szczecin.

Districts
Members of the legislature are elected from five districts and serve five-year terms. Districts does not have the constituencies' formal names. Instead, each constituency has a number and territorial description.

See also 

 Polish Regional Assembly
 West Pomeranian Voivodeship

References

External links 
 Official website
 Executive board official website

West Pomeranian
Assembly
Unicameral legislatures